Saint-Sylvestre may refer to:
 Saint-Sylvestre, Quebec
 Saint-Sylvestre, Ardèche, France
 Saint-Sylvestre, Haute-Savoie, France
 Saint-Sylvestre, Haute-Vienne, France

See also
 Pope Sylvester I, honored in the Catholic Church and the Eastern Orthodox Churches as Saint Sylvester
 Saint Sylvester (disambiguation)
 Saint-Sylvestre-Cappel, Nord, France
 Saint-Sylvestre coup d'état
 Saint-Sylvestre-de-Cormeilles, Eure, France
 Saint-Sylvestre-Pragoulin, Puy-de-Dôme, France
 Saint-Sylvestre-sur-Lot, Lot-et-Garonne, France
 Sylvestre (disambiguation)